Koloma may refer to:

 Koloma, a script formerly used for the Kokborok language of India and Bangladesh
 Koloma, California, a Native American settlement

See also
 Coloma (disambiguation)